Herrania is a genus of flowering plants in the family Malvaceae, subfamily Byttnerioideae.

It is closely related to the genus Theobroma, which includes cacao. As of 1999, there were about 17 species in Herrania.

Species
Species include:
 Herrania albiflora
 Herrania amazonica
 Herrania balaensis
 Herrania breviligulata
 Herrania camargoana
 Herrania cuatrecasana
 Herrania dugandii
 Herrania kanukuensis
 Herrania kofanorum
 Herrania laciniifolia
 Herrania lemniscata
 Herrania mariae
 Herrania nitida
 Herrania nycterodendron
 Herrania pulcherrima
 Herrania purpurea
 Herrania tomentella
 Herrania umbratica

References

 
Malvaceae genera
Taxonomy articles created by Polbot